Type 61 AAA guns may refer to:

 Type 61 25mm AAA guns
 Type 61 30mm AAA guns